R. Sedunathan is an Indian politician and was a Member of the Legislative Assembly. He was elected to the Tamil Nadu legislative assembly as a Dravida Munnetra Kazhagam (DMK) candidate from Tindivanam constituency in the 1996 election.

References 

Dravida Munnetra Kazhagam politicians
Tamil Nadu MLAs 1996–2001
Possibly living people
Year of birth missing